The Free Press (formerly known as Common Sense) is an American media company founded by Bari Weiss and Nellie Bowles and is based in Los Angeles, California.  The newsletter was first published in 2021 while its associated media company officially launched in 2022.

History 
Bari Weiss and Nellie Bowles launched Common Sense on Substack in January 2021 after Weiss’ resignation from The New York Times. The newsletter was named after the political pamphlet of the same name by Thomas Paine. It covered politics, culture, and current events.

Weiss eventually rebranded Common Sense as The Free Press. In 2022, she expanded The Free Press into a media company with staff writers and a subscription-based business model. Journalists and writers who have written for The Free Press include Emily Yoffe and Michael Shellenberger. The Free Press has also hired Andy Mills, former producer of The Daily, to develop audio programming for the company.

The Free Press published information about the Twitter Files after Twitter CEO Elon Musk provided Weiss with access to records of Twitter's internal communications in December 2022. The information Weiss discussed included blacklisting of accounts and suppression of trending topics.

References

External links

Publications established in 2021
Mass media in the United States
American news websites
American online journalism